Ballybofey is a town located on the south bank of the River Finn, County Donegal, Ireland. Together with the smaller town of Stranorlar on the north side of the River Finn, the towns form the Twin Towns of Ballybofey-Stranorlar. Ballybofey-Stranorlar, a census town, had a population of 4,852 in 2016.

History
A few miles west of Ballybofey, on the main road to Fintown (the R252 regional road), is the Glenmore Estate, located at Welchtown. The estate formerly included Glenmore Lodge, a country house that stood on the opposite, southern bank of the River Finn, near Glenmore Bridge. The house was originally built in the Georgian-style in the mid-to-late-18th-century. It was reworked for Sir William Styles in the neo-Tudor-style in the early 20th century. The house was demolished in the 1990s. The private estate is now known for its fishing and hunting.

The town grew rapidly in the 19th and 20th centuries. There are no schools or churches in the town of Ballybofey itself, with all these amenities lying either across the bridge in Stranorlar or outside the town limits. This is due to laws during plantation times when certain Catholic buildings were not allowed within a specified range of Protestant towns, in this case Stranorlar, though Stranorlar now has both a Roman Catholic and a Church of Ireland church.

Events
Ballybofey previously played host to an annual Twin Towns Festival. The last of these took place in August 2007.

The Balor Arts Centre is a 300-seat arts and theatre complex, and Butt Drama Circle is a local amateur drama group.

Sport
Ballybofey is home to Finn Park where League of Ireland side Finn Harps play their home games. Seán MacCumhaill Park is also located in Ballybofey, where the Donegal senior football team have their county office and play most of their home games.

Transport
Ballybofey railway station opened on 3 June 1895, but closed on 15 December 1947.

People
 Joseph Barclay Pentland (1797-1873) - geographer, natural scientist, and traveller.
 Isaac Butt (1813-1879) - politician, leader of the Home Rule League, born a short distance away in Glenfin, where the Isaac Butt Memorial Hall stands
 Jimmy Kelly (1911-1970) - footballer
 Ernan McMullin (1924-2011) - philosopher
 Conal Gallen (born 1955) - singer and comedian. 
 Gerald Porter (born 1968) - darts player
 John Dunleavy (born 1991) - footballer
 Jason Quigley (born 1991) - boxer

See also
 List of populated places in Ireland
 List of market houses in the Republic of Ireland
 Stranorlar County Mother & Baby Home

References

External links

 Ballybofey/Stranorlar

 
Towns and villages in County Donegal
Twin cities